β-Araneosene is a molecule first isolated in 1975 from the mold Sordaria araneosa by Borschberg. This unprecedented diterpene framework was given the name “araneosene”.  In 1976, the skeletal class was renamed to “dolabellane” due to the isolation of several compounds containing this framework found from the sea hare Dolabella californica. Since their initial discovery, there are now more than 150 known dolabellanes, mostly isolated from marine sources.

Biosynthesis
The exact biosynthesis of β-araneosene is not known, however like other diterpenes, it is assumed to originate with geranylgeranyl pyrophosphate.  The pyrophosphate dissociates to generate an allylic cation at the tail of the molecule.  Next a cascade of cyclizations yields the stable β-araneosene-15-yl cation. Finally, elimination of the adjacent proton yields β–araneosene. It has been proposed that other diterpenes including fusicoccanes, dolastanes, and neodolabellanes also proceed through these intermediates.

References

Diterpenes
Cyclopentanes
Bicyclic compounds